LYRIQ or Lyriq may refer to:

 Cadillac LYRIQ, an electric vehicle by General Motors
 Lyriq Bent, a Jamaican-American actor

See also
Lyric (disambiguation)